The women's team compound archery competition at the 2014 Asian Games in Incheon was held from 23 to 27 September at Gyeyang Asiad Archery Field.

A total of 9 teams participated in the qualification round with all 9 teams progressing to the knockout round.

Schedule
All times are Korea Standard Time (UTC+09:00)

Results

Ranking round

Knockout round

References

Women's compound team